Glovelier railway station is a railway station in the former municipality of Glovelier, now part of Haute-Sorne, in the Swiss canton of Jura. It is an intermediate stop on the standard gauge Delémont–Delle line of Swiss Federal Railways and the eastern terminus of the  gauge La Chaux-de-Fonds–Glovelier line of Chemins de fer du Jura.

Services 
 the following services stop at Glovelier:

 Regio: hourly service to La Chaux-de-Fonds.

References

External links 
 
 

Railway stations in the canton of Jura
Swiss Federal Railways stations